Marcos Paulo "Marcão" dos Santos (born 25 May 1976) is a Brazilian male handball player. He was a member of the Brazil men's national handball team, playing as a goalkeeper. He was a part of the  team at the 2004 Summer Olympics. On club level he played for Metodista in Brazil. His brother Maik Ferreira dos Santos was also an international handball player who competed at the 2008 Summer Olympics.

Titles
Pan American Men's Club Handball Championship:
2017
South and Central American Men's Club Handball Championship:
2021

Individual awards and achievements

Best Goalkeeper
Liga Nacional de Handebol 2016
2017 Pan American Men's Club Handball Championship

References

1976 births
Living people
Brazilian male handball players
Handball players at the 2004 Summer Olympics
Olympic handball players of Brazil
People from Santo André, São Paulo
Pan American Games medalists in handball
Pan American Games silver medalists for Brazil
Handball players at the 2011 Pan American Games
Medalists at the 2011 Pan American Games
Sportspeople from São Paulo (state)
20th-century Brazilian people